Thomas William Shales (born November 3, 1944) is an American writer and retired critic of television programming and operations. He was a television critic for The Washington Post from 1977 to 2010, for which he received the Pulitzer Prize for Criticism in 1988. He also writes a column for the television news trade publication NewsPro, published by Crain Communications.

Early life
Shales was born in Elgin, Illinois, the son of Hulda Louise (née Reko) and Clyde LeRoy Shales. Shales's first professional job was with radio station WRMN/WRMN-FM in Elgin at the age of 18. He served as the station's disc jockey, local news reporter, writer and announcer, on both the AM and FM bands. He later worked with Voice of America as a producer of broadcasts to the Far East.

Shales graduated from American University in Washington, D.C., where he was editor-in-chief of the student newspaper, The Eagle, for the 1966–1967 academic year, as well as the paper's movie critic.

Career
Shales worked as entertainment editor at the Washington Examiner from 1968 to 1971. He joined The Washington Post as a writer in the Style section in 1972, was named chief television critic in July 1977, and was appointed TV editor in June 1979. In 2006, he ceased to be a staff writer for the Post and went on contract, where he remained until 2010, when he was laid off entirely by the newspaper.

During 1998–1999, Shales was a frequent film critic for Morning Edition on National Public Radio. He was twice a guest co-host on the television show Roger Ebert & the Movies after the death of Gene Siskel. Shales was a member of the Peabody Awards Board of Jurors from 1991 to 1996.

Shales has published four books, including two he co-wrote with James Andrew Miller. In 2002, Shales and Miller published Live From New York: An Uncensored History of Saturday Night Live, which covers the history of the sketch-comedy variety show, and provides a behind-the-scenes look at its stars and production process. The book was re-released in 2015 to coincide with Saturday Night Live's 40th anniversary. The updated edition contained over 100 pages of new material. In 2011, Shales and Miller published their second book together, Those Guys Have All the Fun: Inside the World of ESPN, which chronicles the history of the network ESPN from its infancy in 1979 through 2010. In 2015, the Focus Features optioned the book to adapt it into a movie.

Of Shales, the Forbes Media Guide Five Hundred, 1994 wrote: "Forget the middle ground, Shales either loves it or hates it – and his reviews of TV shows and personalities are often unabashed paroxysms of that love or hate....Like the medium he covers, Shales turns out fast-paced and amusing fare that often lacks depth".

Honors
Shales received the Pulitzer Prize for Criticism in 1988 for his work at The Washington Post.

Selected works

References

External links
 Archive of Tom Shales' blog

1944 births
20th-century American journalists
20th-century American male writers
20th-century American non-fiction writers
21st-century American male writers
21st-century American non-fiction writers
American University alumni
American male journalists
American television critics
Journalists from Illinois
Living people
People from Elgin, Illinois
Pulitzer Prize for Criticism winners
The Washington Post journalists
Voice of America people